Dushman (translation: Enemy) is a 1998 Indian Hindi-language psychological thriller film starring Kajol, Sanjay Dutt and Ashutosh Rana. The film is directed by Tanuja Chandra and produced by Mukesh Bhatt and Pooja Bhatt. 

The film is a remake of Hollywood film Eye for an Eye.

At the 44th Filmfare Awards, Dushman won Best Villain (Rana), in addition to a nomination for Best Supporting Actress (Tanvi Azmi). Moreover, Kajol also received a Best Actress nomination at the ceremony for her performance in the film, but instead won the award for her performance in Kuch Kuch Hota Hai.

Plot
Sonia and Naina Sehgal (Kajol) are twins. Though identical, they couldn't be more different, with Sonia being outgoing and extroverted, and Naina being shy and introverted. In a parallel storyline, the police are hunting for a sadistic killer and rapist, Gokul Pandit (Ashutosh Rana). 

Tragedy strikes the Sehgal household when Gokul rapes and brutally kills Sonia. After a police investigation, Gokul is caught but declared innocent as Sunanda, one of the main witnesses (and Gokul's fiancé) gives a false statement in court. Naina is distraught and vows to hunt down Gokul. Gokul soon goes after Naina and she realizes she needs help to overcome her fear of Gokul. With revenge in her mind, she meets Suraj Singh Rathod (Sanjay Dutt), a blind military veteran, who helps her to rid her fear of Gokul. While Suraj trains Naina, they develop feelings for each other. 

One day - after an argument - Suraj refuses to meet Naina and she decides to go after Gokul all by herself, who kidnaps Naina's younger sister (Dia) from school in order to scare Naina. Naina's mother consequently decides to leave for Nainital immediately as her daughter's life is at risk. However, Naina cannot control her hatred and wanted to avenge her sister at any cost. Naina lays a trap for Gokul and tries to kill him but Gokul ties her up and tries to rape her like her sister. Suraj arrives at her house and fights Gokul but ends up being stabbed. Naina manages to get free and fatally shoot Gokul.

Suraj recovers from his injuries and decides to go away from Naina, but he realizes that she loves him and cannot live without him. The movie ends with Naina and Suraj getting together at the airport where Suraj was about to leave the city.

Cast  
Kajol (in a dual role) as Naina & Sonia Anuradha Sehgal 
Sanjay Dutt as Major Suraj Singh Rathod
Ashutosh Rana as Gokul Pandit
Tanvi Azmi as Mrs. Poornima Sehgal
Jas Arora as Kabir Anuradha Singh Rathod
Pramod Muthu as ACP Santosh Singh Sehgal
Kunal Khemu as Bheem Bahadur Singh
Pratima Kazmi as prosecuting attorney
Anupam Shyam as Inspector Dubey 
Vani Tripathi as Sunanda Tripathi
Amardeep Jha as Jaya
Rahul Singh as taxi driver

Soundtrack
The music for the film was composed by Uttam Singh and Anand Bakshi penned the lyrics.

Awards and nominations

Notes

References

External links

1998 films
1990s Hindi-language films
Twins in Indian films
Indian remakes of American films
Indian psychological thriller films
Indian serial killer films
Indian films about revenge
Indian rape and revenge films
Films about rape in India
Films directed by Tanuja Chandra